The Electricar was a French electric car manufactured from 1920 to 1921.  An urban car, it used a ½hp electric engine manufactured by a M. Couaillet of Paris.  It was a single-seat three-wheeler with a single front wheel.

References

David Burgess Wise, The New Illustrated Encyclopedia of Automobiles.

Defunct motor vehicle manufacturers of France
Electric cars